Mark Kaylor (born 11 May 1961) is a former professional British boxer.

Kaylor was born in Canning Town but from the age of nine was brought up in Stanford-le-Hope, Essex. Kaylor won the British schoolboy title the first year he was eligible to take part and at the age of 16, moved back to Canning Town to live with his grandmother so that he could join a bigger boxing club at West Ham. In 1979, at the age of 17, Kaylor won the National Association of Boys Clubs Championships and the London senior title. In 1980, Kaylor won the British Amateur Boxing Association Championships and went to the European Junior championships in Rimini, Italy. Kaylor represented Great Britain in the 1980 Moscow Olympics, losing on a split decision in the quarter-finals. Perhaps his most famous fight came in 1985, when he defeated Errol Christie in the eighth round of a hard-fought match, marred with controversy due to a pre-fight punch-up between the pair, and by death threats from racist fans against Christie. Despite the controversy, Kaylor and Christie in fact showed great respect for each other after the match. Kaylor later commented, "Back then, I had a quick temper that I’d rather not have had. There was always this spark in my head! Today, I’m embarrassed by it. Errol was a nice guy. There’s no way I could behave like that now."

Kaylor appeared in Ron Peck's 1991 film Fighters, which follows a group of young East End boxers as they try to make it to the top in the boxing game.

Kaylor worked with Peck again in 1996, this time in a semi-improvised, fictional film  Real Money, about a group of young boxers getting drawn into underworld villainy and crime. Real Money also starred other well known and well respected faces from the boxing world, such as father and son boxing legends Jimmy Tibbs and Mark Tibbs, Steve Roberts and Jason Rowland. boxer, writer and actor Jimmy Flint who had also starred in many of Ron Peck's films, and later went on to star in many films such as Lock Stock and Two Smoking Barrels, Revolver and Rise of The Footsoldier.

In 1996, Kaylor moved to California with his family. He is also very close to his nephew Charles Kaylor. He now coaches boxing and is an aerobics instructor at a gym.

Professional boxing record

|-
|align="center" colspan=8|40 Wins (34 knockouts, 6 decisions), 7 Losses (4 knockouts, 3 decisions), 1 Draw 
|-
| align="center" style="border-style: none none solid solid; background: #e3e3e3"|Result
| align="center" style="border-style: none none solid solid; background: #e3e3e3"|Record
| align="center" style="border-style: none none solid solid; background: #e3e3e3"|Opponent
| align="center" style="border-style: none none solid solid; background: #e3e3e3"|Type
| align="center" style="border-style: none none solid solid; background: #e3e3e3"|Round
| align="center" style="border-style: none none solid solid; background: #e3e3e3"|Date
| align="center" style="border-style: none none solid solid; background: #e3e3e3"|Location
| align="center" style="border-style: none none solid solid; background: #e3e3e3"|Notes
|-align=center
|Loss
|
|align=left| James Cook
|TKO
|6
|1 June 1991
|align=left| York Hall, Bethnal Green, London, United Kingdom
|align=left|
|-
|Win
|
|align=left| Roland Ericsson
|TKO
|4
|20 March 1991
|align=left| Battersea Town Hall, Battersea, London, United Kingdom
|align=left|
|-
|Win
|
|align=left| Shannon Landberg
|TKO
|6
|7 March 1991
|align=left| Basildon Festival Hall, Basildon, Essex, United Kingdom
|align=left|
|-
|Loss
|
|align=left| Mauro Galvano
|UD
|12
|31 March 1990
|align=left| Capo d'Orlando, Italy
|align=left|
|-
|Draw
|
|align=left| Jerry Okorodudu
|MD
|10
|26 June 1989
|align=left| Marriott Hotel, Irvine, California, United States
|align=left|
|-
|Loss
|
|align=left| Tom Collins
|KO
|9
|11 May 1988
|align=left| Grand Hall, Wembley, London, United Kingdom
|align=left|
|-
|Win
|
|align=left| Roy Safford
|KO
|2
|29 March 1988
|align=left| Wembley Arena, Wembley, London, United Kingdom
|align=left|
|-
|Win
|
|align=left| Charles Henderson
|TKO
|3
|3 February 1988
|align=left| Grand Hall, Wembley, London, United Kingdom
|align=left|
|-
|Win
|
|align=left| Jamie Howe
|TKO
|4
|24 October 1987
|align=left| White Hart Lane, Tottenham, London, United Kingdom
|align=left|
|-
|Win
|
|align=left| Jack Basting
|KO
|6
|27 June 1987
|align=left| Palais des Festivals, Cannes, France
|align=left|
|-
|Win
|
|align=left| Tommy Taylor
|TKO
|4
|18 April 1987
|align=left| Royal Albert Hall, Kensington, London, United Kingdom
|align=left|
|-
|Win
|
|align=left| Jimmy Shavers
|PTS
|8
|22 February 1987
|align=left| Grand Hall, Wembley, London, United Kingdom
|align=left|
|-
|Loss
|
|align=left| Herol Graham
|TKO
|8
|4 November 1986
|align=left| Wembley Arena, Wembley, London, United Kingdom
|align=left|
|-
|Win
|
|align=left| Tony Harrison
|TKO
|9
|17 September 1986
|align=left| Royal Albert Hall, Kensington, London, United Kingdom
|align=left|
|-
|Win
|
|align=left| Tony Cerda
|TKO
|6
|19 July 1986
|align=left| Wembley Stadium, Wembley, London, United Kingdom
|align=left|
|-
|Win
|
|align=left| Errol Christie
|KO
|8
|5 November 1985
|align=left| Wembley, London, United Kingdom
|align=left|
|-
|Win
|
|align=left| Dwight Walker
|PTS
|10
|16 June 1985
|align=left| York Hall, Bethnal Green, London, United Kingdom
|align=left|
|-
|Win
|
|align=left| Richard Beranek
|KO
|3
|14 April 1985
|align=left| York Hall, Bethnal Green, London, United Kingdom
|align=left|
|-
|Loss
|
|align=left| Tony Sibson
|UD
|12
|27 November 1984
|align=left| Wembley Arena, Wembley, London, United Kingdom
|align=left|
|-
|Win
|
|align=left| David Todt
|TKO
|6
|16 October 1984
|align=left| Royal Albert Hall, Kensington, London, United Kingdom
|align=left|
|-
|Loss
|
|align=left| Buster Drayton
|TKO
|7
|13 May 1984
|align=left| Empire Pool, Wembley, London, United Kingdom
|align=left|
|-
|Win
|
|align=left| Randy Smith
|PTS
|10
|13 March 1984
|align=left| Empire Pool, Wembley, London, United Kingdom
|align=left|
|-
|Win
|
|align=left| Ralph Moncrief
|TKO
|5
|31 January 1984
|align=left| Royal Albert Hall, Kensington, London, United Kingdom
|align=left|
|-
|Loss
|
|align=left| Tony Cerda
|DQ
|9
|22 November 1983
|align=left| Wembley Arena, Wembley, London, United Kingdom
|align=left|
|-
|Win
|
|align=left| Roy Gumbs
|KO
|5
|14 September 1983
|align=left| Alexandra Pavilion, Muswell Hill, United Kingdom
|align=left|
|-
|Win
|
|align=left| Bobby West
|TKO
|5
|31 May 1983
|align=left| Royal Albert Hall, Kensington, London, United Kingdom
|align=left|
|-
|Win
|
|align=left| Bobby Watts
|TKO
|4
|3 May 1983
|align=left| Wembley Arena, Wembley, London, United Kingdom
|align=left|
|-
|Win
|
|align=left| Glen McEwan
|TKO
|2
|1 March 1983
|align=left| Royal Albert Hall, Kensington, London, United Kingdom
|align=left|
|-
|Win
|
|align=left| Henry Walker
|PTS
|10
|18 January 1983
|align=left| Royal Albert Hall, Kensington, London, United Kingdom
|align=left|
|-
|Win
|
|align=left| Juan Munoz Holgado
|KO
|2
|7 December 1982
|align=left| Royal Albert Hall, Kensington, London, United Kingdom
|align=left|
|-
|Win
|
|align=left| Eddie Smith
|TKO
|3
|9 November 1982
|align=left| Royal Albert Hall, Kensington, London, United Kingdom
|align=left|
|-
|Win
|
|align=left| Doug James
|TKO
|2
|26 October 1982
|align=left| York Hall, Bethnal Green, London, United Kingdom
|align=left|
|-
|Win
|
|align=left| Maurice Bufi
|TKO
|3
|22 September 1982
|align=left| Mayfair Sporting Club, Mayfair, London, United Kingdom
|align=left|
|-
|Win
|
|align=left| Steve Williams
|TKO
|2
|1 June 1982
|align=left| Royal Albert Hall, Kensington, London, United Kingdom
|align=left|
|-
|Win
|
|align=left| Joel Bonnetaz
|TKO
|3
|20 April 1982
|align=left| Royal Albert Hall, Kensington, London, United Kingdom
|align=left|
|-
|Win
|
|align=left| Alfonso Redondo
|TKO
|5
|17 March 1982
|align=left| Royal Albert Hall, Kensington, London, United Kingdom
|align=left|
|-
|Win
|
|align=left| Dario De Asa
|TKO
|3
|2 March 1982
|align=left| Royal Albert Hall, Kensington, London, United Kingdom
|align=left|
|-
|Win
|
|align=left| Romal Ambrose
|KO
|1
|9 February 1982
|align=left| Royal Albert Hall, Kensington, London, United Kingdom
|align=left|
|-
|Win
|
|align=left| Billy Savage
|TKO
|2
|24 November 1981
|align=left| Wembley Arena, Wembley, London, United Kingdom
|align=left|
|-
|Win
|
|align=left| Winston Burnett
|TKO
|6
|3 November 1981
|align=left| Royal Albert Hall, Kensington, London, United Kingdom
|align=left|
|-
|Win
|
|align=left| George Danahar
|TKO
|3
|20 October 1981
|align=left| York Hall, Bethnal Green, London, United Kingdom
|align=left|
|-
|Win
|
|align=left| Jimmy Everard Ellis
|TKO
|5
|15 September 1981
|align=left| Wembley Arena, Wembley, London, United Kingdom
|align=left|
|-
|Win
|
|align=left| Joe Gregory
|TKO
|6
|26 May 1981
|align=left| York Hall, Bethnal Green, London, United Kingdom
|align=left|
|-
|Win
|
|align=left| Peter Bassey
|PTS
|8
|17 March 1981
|align=left| Wembley Arena, Wembley, London, United Kingdom
|align=left|
|-
|Win
|
|align=left| Martin McEwan
|TKO
|6
|24 February 1981
|align=left| Royal Albert Hall, Kensington, London, United Kingdom
|align=left|
|-
|Win
|
|align=left| Winston Burnett
|PTS
|8
|27 January 1981
|align=left| Royal Albert Hall, Kensington, London, United Kingdom
|align=left|
|-
|Win
|
|align=left| Clifton Wallace
|TKO
|3
|8 December 1980
|align=left| Royal Albert Hall, Kensington, London, United Kingdom
|align=left|
|-
|Win
|
|align=left| Peter Morris
|TKO
|5
|14 October 1980
|align=left| Royal Albert Hall, Kensington, London, United Kingdom
|align=left|
|}’

References

External links
Boxing Monthly, January 2009 edition 
BoxRec factfile on Mark Kaylor 
YouTube video of Kaylor's 1985 fight with Errol Christie 

English male boxers
Middleweight boxers
Boxers from Greater London
People from Canning Town
1961 births
Living people
Olympic boxers of Great Britain
Boxers at the 1980 Summer Olympics